Newby (from Old Norse Nýbýr = new farmstead) may refer to:

Places

England

Cumbria
Newby, Cumbria, near Penrith
Newby Bridge, in Furness

Lancashire
Newby, Lancashire, historically in the West Riding of Yorkshire

North Yorkshire
Newby, Craven
Newby, Hambleton, near Stokesley
Newby Wiske, Hambleton
Newby, Huby, Harrogate
Newby, Skelton-on-Ure, Harrogate District
Newby Hall, an 18th-century country house
Newby-on-Swale, Harrogate District, a deserted medieval village
Newby Park
Newby, Scarborough
Newby and Scalby, Scarborough
Newby Head, a former inn, now a farm, near Ribblehead in Craven

Elsewhere
Newby, Illinois

People
Basil Newby (born 1951), British entrepreneur and businessman
Brendan Newby (born 1996), Irish-American freestyle skier
Chas Newby (born 1941), English musician, temporarily bassist for The Beatles
Chris Newby (born 1957), British film director and screenwriter
Craig Newby (born 1979), New Zealand rugby player
Dangerfield Newby (1815–1859), American abolitionist
Edward W. B. Newby (1804–1870), American soldier
Eric Newby (1919–2006), English author
Frank Newby (1926–2001), eminent structural engineer
Sir Howard Newby (1947–2010), British sociologist
Joey Newby (born 1982), American professional baseball player
Jon Newby (born 1978), British football (soccer) player
Jonathon Newby, American singer
Kenneth Newby (born 1956), Canadian composer, performer and media artist
Oliver Newby (born 1984), English cricketer
Paul Martin Newby (born 1955), American judge
Paula Newby-Fraser (born 1962), African athlete
P. H. Newby (1918–1997), English novelist, winner of the first  Booker Prize
Richard Newby, Baron Newby (born 1953), British politician
Thomas Cautley Newby (1798–1882), London publisher and printer
William Newby (Cambridgeshire cricketer) (1836–1932), English cricketer
William Newby (South African cricketer) (1855–1921), South African cricketer